This is a list of approximately 1400 species in Bembidion, a genus of ground beetles in the family Carabidae.

Bembidion species

A

 Bembidion abbreviatum Solsky, 1874
 Bembidion abchasicum Müller-Motzfeld, 1989
 Bembidion abdelkrimi Netolitzky, 1926
 Bembidion abeillei Bedel, 1879
 Bembidion aberdarense Alluaud, 1939
 Bembidion abnormale Jedlicka, 1965
 Bembidion achipungi Moret & Toledano, 2002
 Bembidion acticola Casey, 1884
 Bembidion actuarium Broun, 1903
 Bembidion actuosum Casey, 1918
 Bembidion acutifrons LeConte, 1879
 Bembidion adductum Casey, 1918
 Bembidion adelaidae Lindroth, 1980
 Bembidion admirandum (Sharp, 1903)
 Bembidion adowanum Chaudoir, 1876
 Bembidion advena Sharp, 1903
 Bembidion adygorum Belousov & Sokolov, 1996
 Bembidion aegrum Erwin, 1982
 Bembidion aegyptiacum Dejean, 1831
 Bembidion aeneicolle (LeConte, 1847)
 Bembidion aeneipes Bates, 1883
 Bembidion aeneum Germar, 1823
 Bembidion aenulum Hayward, 1901
 Bembidion aeruginosum (Gebler, 1833)
 Bembidion aestuarii (Ueno & Habu, 1954)
 Bembidion aethiopicum Raffray, 1886
 Bembidion aetolicum Apfelbeck, 1901
 Bembidion affine Say, 1823
 Bembidion africanum Chaudoir, 1876
 Bembidion afroseptentrionale Neri & Gudenzi, 2013
 Bembidion agonoides Taglianti & Toledano, 2008
 Bembidion ahrensi Schmidt, 2018
 Bembidion ainu Habu & Baba, 1968
 Bembidion ajmonis Netolitzky, 1935
 Bembidion alacre (Broun, 1921)
 Bembidion alaf Britton, 1948
 Bembidion alaskense Lindroth, 1962
 Bembidion alatum Darlington, 1953
 Bembidion albertisi Putzeys, 1875
 Bembidion albescens (Bates, 1878)
 Bembidion albovirens (Sloane, 1903)
 Bembidion algidum Andrewes, 1935
 Bembidion aliense Habu, 1973
 Bembidion alikhelicum Kirschenhofer, 1989
 Bembidion allegroi Toledano, 2008
 Bembidion almum J.Sahlberg, 1900
 Bembidion alpineanum Casey, 1924
 Bembidion alsium Coquerel, 1866
 Bembidion altaicum (Gebler, 1833)
 Bembidion altestriatum Netolitzky, 1934
 Bembidion alticola A.Fiori, 1903
 Bembidion amamiense Morita, 2008
 Bembidion amaurum Bates, 1883
 Bembidion ambiguum Dejean, 1831
 Bembidion americanum Dejean, 1831
 Bembidion amnicola J.Sahlberg, 1900
 Bembidion amoenum R.F.Sahlberg, 1844
 Bembidion ampliatum Casey, 1918
 Bembidion ampliceps Casey, 1918
 Bembidion amurense (Motschulsky, 1860)
 Bembidion ancash Toledano, 2008
 Bembidion anchonoderus Bates, 1878
 Bembidion andersoni Toledano, 2008
 Bembidion andinum Bates, 1891
 Bembidion andreae (Fabricius, 1787)
 Bembidion andrewesi Jedlicka, 1932
 Bembidion angelieri (de Saludo, 1970)
 Bembidion angulicolle (Putzeys, 1878)
 Bembidion anguliferum (LeConte, 1852)
 Bembidion angustatum Baehr, 1995
 Bembidion antarcticum Fairmaire, 1889
 Bembidion antennarium (Morvan, 1972)
 Bembidion anthracinum Germain, 1906
 Bembidion antiquum Dejean, 1831
 Bembidion antoinei Puel, 1935
 Bembidion aparupa Schmidt, 2018
 Bembidion apicale Ménétriés, 1832
 Bembidion approximatum (LeConte, 1852)
 Bembidion aratum (LeConte, 1852)
 Bembidion arcticum Lindroth, 1963
 Bembidion arenobile Maddison, 2008
 Bembidion argaeicola Ganglbauer, 1905
 Bembidion argenteolum Ahrens, 1812
 Bembidion aricense (Jeannel, 1962)
 Bembidion armeniacum Chaudoir, 1846
 Bembidion armuelles Erwin, 1982
 Bembidion articulatoides Jedlicka, 1932
 Bembidion articulatum (Panzer, 1796)
 Bembidion ascendens K.Daniel, 1902
 Bembidion asiaeminoris Netolitzky, 1935
 Bembidion asiaticum Jedlicka, 1965
 Bembidion aspericolle (Germar, 1829)
 Bembidion assimile Gyllenhal, 1810
 Bembidion astrabadense (Mannerheim, 1844)
 Bembidion ateradustum Liebherr, 2008
 Bembidion atillense Toledano, 2008
 Bembidion atlanticum Wollaston, 1854
 Bembidion atomarium (Sharp, 1903)
 Bembidion atripes (Motschulsky, 1844)
 Bembidion atrocaeruleum (Stephens, 1828)
 Bembidion atrox Andrewes, 1935
 Bembidion atrum Germain, 1906
 Bembidion aubei Solier, 1849
 Bembidion augusti Neri & Toledano, 2021
 Bembidion augustovignai Toledano, Bonavita & Schmidt, 2021
 Bembidion auratum (Perkins, 1917)
 Bembidion aureofuscum Bates, 1883
 Bembidion australe (Bonavita & Taglianti, 2021)
 Bembidion auxiliator Casey, 1924
 Bembidion avaricum Belousov & Sokolov, 1988
 Bembidion avidum Casey, 1918
 Bembidion axillare (Motschulsky, 1844)
 Bembidion azuayi Moret & Toledano, 2002
 Bembidion azurescens Dalla Torre, 1877

B

 Bembidion babaulti Andrewes, 1924
 Bembidion bactrianum K.Daniel, 1902
 Bembidion badakshanicum Mikhailov, 1988
 Bembidion baehri Toledano, 2000
 Bembidion baghlanicum Kirschenhofer, 1989
 Bembidion baicalicum (Motschulsky, 1844)
 Bembidion bakeri Andrewes, 1924
 Bembidion balcanicum Apfelbeck, 1899
 Bembidion baleense Toledano, Bonavita & Schmidt, 2021
 Bembidion balli Lindroth, 1962
 Bembidion bamyanense Neri & Toledano, 2018
 Bembidion bandotaro Morita, 1991
 Bembidion barkamense Toledano, 1998
 Bembidion barrense Erwin, 1982
 Bembidion basicorne Notman, 1920
 Bembidion basilewskyi (Bonavita & Taglianti, 2021)
 Bembidion basiplagiatum (Putzeys, 1878)
 Bembidion basistriatum Fairmaire, 1893
 Bembidion bedelianum Netolitzky, 1918
 Bembidion beesoni Andrewes, 1933
 Bembidion bellorum Maddison, 2008
 Bembidion beloborodovi Belousov & Mikhailov, 1990
 Bembidion belousovi Toledano, 2000
 Bembidion beutelsbach Neri & Toledano, 2020
 Bembidion bibliani Moret & Toledano, 2002
 Bembidion bicikense (Bonavita & Taglianti, 2010)
 Bembidion bicolor (Bonniard de Saludo, 1970)
 Bembidion bifossulatum (LeConte, 1852)
 Bembidion biguttatum (Fabricius, 1779)
 Bembidion bimaculatum (Kirby, 1837)
 Bembidion birulai Poppius, 1910
 Bembidion bisulcatum (Chaudoir, 1844)
 Bembidion blackburni (Sharp, 1903)
 Bembidion blandulum Netolitzky, 1910
 Bembidion bodenheimeri Netolitzky, 1935
 Bembidion bolivari Moret & Toledano, 2002
 Bembidion bolsoni Toledano, 2002
 Bembidion bonariense Boheman, 1858
 Bembidion bonniardae Toledano, 2002
 Bembidion bordoni Toledano, 2008
 Bembidion botezati Netolitzky, 1922
 Bembidion bowditchii LeConte, 1878
 Bembidion boyaca Toledano, 2008
 Bembidion bracculatum Bates, 1889
 Bembidion brachythorax Lindroth, 1963
 Bembidion braminum Andrewes, 1923
 Bembidion brancuccii Toledano, 2000
 Bembidion breve (Motschulsky, 1845)
 Bembidion brevistriatum Hayward, 1897
 Bembidion brittoni Fassati, 1955
 Bembidion brullei Gemminger & Harold, 1868
 Bembidion brunnicorne Dejean, 1831
 Bembidion brunoi (Bonavita, 2001)
 Bembidion bruxellense Wesmael, 1835
 Bembidion bryanti Andrewes, 1921
 Bembidion bualei du Val, 1852
 Bembidion bucephalum Netolitzky, 1920
 Bembidion bugnioni K.Daniel, 1902
 Bembidion bulgani Jedlicka, 1968
 Bembidion bulirschianum Toledano & Schmidt, 2008
 Bembidion bullerense Larochelle & Larivière, 2015
 Bembidion buxtoni (Basilewsky, 1953)

C

 Bembidion californicum Hayward, 1897
 Bembidion caligatum Jeanne & Müller-Motzfeld, 1982
 Bembidion callacalla Toledano, 2008
 Bembidion callens Casey, 1918
 Bembidion callipeplum Bates, 1878
 Bembidion callosum Küster, 1847
 Bembidion calverti Germain, 1906
 Bembidion camposi Moret & Toledano, 2002
 Bembidion canadianum Casey, 1924
 Bembidion cantalicum Fauvel, 1885
 Bembidion caporiaccoi Netolitzky, 1935
 Bembidion captivorum Netolitzky, 1943
 Bembidion caricum J.Sahlberg, 1908
 Bembidion carinatum (LeConte, 1852)
 Bembidion carinula Chaudoir, 1868
 Bembidion carnifex Netolitzky, 1922
 Bembidion carolinense Casey, 1924
 Bembidion carreli Moret & Toledano, 2002
 Bembidion cassinense (Roig-Juñent & Gianuca, 2001)
 Bembidion cassolai (Bonavita & Taglianti, 1993)
 Bembidion castaneipenne du Val, 1852
 Bembidion castor Lindroth, 1963
 Bembidion catharinae Netolitzky, 1943
 Bembidion caucasicum (Motschulsky, 1844)
 Bembidion cavazzutii Toledano & Schmidt, 2008
 Bembidion cayambense Bates, 1891
 Bembidion cekalovici (Jeannel, 1962)
 Bembidion cekalovicianum Toledano, 2002
 Bembidion celisi (Basilewsky, 1955)
 Bembidion chaklaense Schmidt, 2018
 Bembidion chakrata Andrewes, 1935
 Bembidion chalceipes Bates, 1878
 Bembidion chalceum Dejean, 1831
 Bembidion chalcodes Andrewes, 1935
 Bembidion chalmeri (Broun, 1886)
 Bembidion championi Bates, 1882
 Bembidion charile Bates, 1867
 Bembidion charon Andrewes, 1926
 Bembidion chaudoirianum Csiki, 1928
 Bembidion chaudoirii Chaudoir, 1850
 Bembidion cheyennense Casey, 1918
 Bembidion chilense Solier, 1849
 Bembidion chilesi Moret & Toledano, 2002
 Bembidion chimborazonum Bates, 1891
 Bembidion chinense Csiki, 1901
 Bembidion chiriqui Erwin, 1982
 Bembidion chloreum Bates, 1873
 Bembidion chloropus Bates, 1883
 Bembidion chlorostictum Reed, 1874
 Bembidion christophi Schmidt, 2018
 Bembidion cilicicum De Monte, 1947
 Bembidion cillenoides Jensen-Haarup, 1910
 Bembidion cimmerium Andrewes, 1922
 Bembidion circassicum (Reitter, 1890)
 Bembidion cirtense Netolitzky, 1914
 Bembidion citulum Casey, 1918
 Bembidion ciudadense Bates, 1891
 Bembidion clarkei (Bonavita & Taglianti, 2021)
 Bembidion clarkii (Dawson, 1849)
 Bembidion clarum Andrewes, 1923
 Bembidion clemens Casey, 1918
 Bembidion cnemidotum Bates, 1883
 Bembidion cocuyanum Toledano, 2008
 Bembidion coecum (Sharp, 1903)
 Bembidion coelestinum (Motschulsky, 1844)
 Bembidion coeruleum Audinet-Serville, 1821
 Bembidion cognatum Dejean, 1831
 Bembidion collutum Bates, 1873
 Bembidion colombianum Toledano, 2008
 Bembidion coloradense Hayward, 1897
 Bembidion colvillense Lindroth, 1965
 Bembidion combustum Ménétriés, 1832
 Bembidion commissum Erichson, 1847
 Bembidion commotum Casey, 1918
 Bembidion compactum Andrewes, 1922
 Bembidion complanatum Heer, 1837
 Bembidion complanulum (Mannerheim, 1853)
 Bembidion compressum Lindroth, 1963
 Bembidion concoeruleum Netolitzky, 1943
 Bembidion concolor (Kirby, 1837)
 Bembidion concretum Casey, 1918
 Bembidion conforme Dejean, 1831
 Bembidion confusum Hayward, 1897
 Bembidion conicolle Motschulsky, 1844
 Bembidion connivens (LeConte, 1852)
 Bembidion consanguineum Hayward, 1897
 Bembidion consimile Hayward, 1897
 Bembidion conspersum Chaudoir, 1868
 Bembidion constricticolle Hayward, 1897
 Bembidion constrictum (LeConte, 1847)
 Bembidion consuetum Casey, 1918
 Bembidion consummatum Bates, 1873
 Bembidion contractum Say, 1823
 Bembidion convergens C.Berg, 1883
 Bembidion convexiusculum (Motschulsky, 1844)
 Bembidion convexulum Hayward, 1897
 Bembidion cooperi Maddison, 2014
 Bembidion cooteri Toledano & Schmidt, 2008
 Bembidion cordatum (LeConte, 1847)
 Bembidion cordicolle du Val, 1852
 Bembidion cordillerae Steinheil, 1869
 Bembidion coreanum Jedlicka, 1946
 Bembidion corgenoma Maddison, 2020
 Bembidion corsicum Csiki, 1928
 Bembidion cortes Erwin, 1982
 Bembidion corticarium (Sharp, 1903)
 Bembidion cosangaense Toledano, 2008
 Bembidion cotopaxi Moret & Toledano, 2002
 Bembidion coxendix Say, 1823
 Bembidion crassicorne Putzeys, 1872
 Bembidion crenulatum Sahlberg, 1844
 Bembidion crotchii Wollaston, 1864
 Bembidion cruciatum Dejean, 1831
 Bembidion csikii Jedlicka, 1932
 Bembidion cubanum Darlington, 1937
 Bembidion culminicola de la Brûlerie, 1876
 Bembidion cumanum Lutshnik, 1938
 Bembidion cupido Andrewes, 1935
 Bembidion cupreolum Solsky, 1874
 Bembidion cupreostriatum Germain, 1906
 Bembidion curtulatum Casey, 1918
 Bembidion curtulum du Val, 1851
 Bembidion cyaneum Chaudoir, 1846
 Bembidion cyclodes Bates, 1884
 Bembidion cymindulum Andrewes, 1930

D

 Bembidion dabashanicum Toledano & Schmidt, 2010
 Bembidion daccordii Toledano, 2005
 Bembidion dagestanum Jedlicka, 1962
 Bembidion daisetsuzanum Habu, 1958
 Bembidion daliangi Toledano, 2000
 Bembidion dalmatinum Dejean, 1831
 Bembidion dammermani Andrewes, 1933
 Bembidion damota Toledano; Bonavita & Schmidt, 2021
 Bembidion dannieae Perrault, 1982
 Bembidion darlingtoni Mutchler, 1934
 Bembidion darlingtonicum Jedlicka, 1951
 Bembidion darlingtonielum Cooper & Maddison, 2014
 Bembidion dauricum (Motschulsky, 1844)
 Bembidion davaai Jedlicka, 1968
 Bembidion davatchii (Morvan, 1971)
 Bembidion davidsoni Moret & Toledano, 2002
 Bembidion daxuense Toledano, 1998
 Bembidion debiliceps Casey, 1918
 Bembidion decolor Apfelbeck, 1911
 Bembidion decorum (Panzer, 1799)
 Bembidion degeense Toledano & Schmidt, 2008
 Bembidion dehiscens Broun, 1893
 Bembidion dejectum Casey, 1884
 Bembidion delamarei (Jeannel, 1962)
 Bembidion deletum Audinet-Serville, 1821
 Bembidion deliae (Morvan, 1973)
 Bembidion demartini Neri & Gudenzi, 2011
 Bembidion demeyeri Toledano & Bonavita, 2016
 Bembidion demidenkoae Dudko, 1999
 Bembidion dentelloides Netolitzky, 1943
 Bembidion dentellum (Thunberg, 1787)
 Bembidion deplanatum A.Morawitz, 1862
 Bembidion depressicolle Landin, 1955
 Bembidion depressiusculum (Motschulsky, 1850)
 Bembidion depressum Ménétriés, 1832
 Bembidion derbesi Solier, 1849
 Bembidion derelictum Alluaud, 1926
 Bembidion dhaulaghiricum Schmidt, 2018
 Bembidion diabola Erwin, 1982
 Bembidion dicksoniae Wollaston, 1877
 Bembidion dieckmanni Fassati, 1957
 Bembidion difficile (Motschulsky, 1844)
 Bembidion difforme (Motschulsky, 1844)
 Bembidion diligens Casey, 1918
 Bembidion dilutipenne Solsky, 1874
 Bembidion dimidiatum Ménétriés, 1832
 Bembidion discoideum Brullé, 1843
 Bembidion discordans Netolitzky, 1935
 Bembidion distinguendum du Val, 1852
 Bembidion dolorosum (Motschulsky, 1850)
 Bembidion doris (Panzer, 1796)
 Bembidion dormeyeri Reitter, 1897
 Bembidion dorsale Say, 1823
 Bembidion drago (Basilewsky, 1958)
 Bembidion dudichi Csiki, 1928
 Bembidion dufourii Perris, 1864
 Bembidion durangoense Bates, 1891
 Bembidion duvali Steinheil, 1869
 Bembidion dyscheres Netolitzky, 1943
 Bembidion dyschirinum LeConte, 1861

E

 Bembidion eburneonigrum Germain, 1906
 Bembidion echarouxi Toledano, 2000
 Bembidion echigonum Habu & Baba, 1957
 Bembidion edwardsi Erwin, 1982
 Bembidion egens Casey, 1918
 Bembidion ehikoense Habu, 1984
 Bembidion eichleri Marggi; Wrase & Huber, 2002
 Bembidion ejusmodi Landin, 1955
 Bembidion elatum Andrewes, 1930
 Bembidion elbursicum Netolitzky, 1939
 Bembidion eleonorae (Bonavita & Taglianti, 1993)
 Bembidion elevatum (Motschulsky, 1844)
 Bembidion elizabethae Hatch, 1950
 Bembidion ellipticocurtum Netolitzky, 1935
 Bembidion embersoni Lindroth, 1980
 Bembidion endymion Andrewes, 1935
 Bembidion engelhardti Jensen-Haarup, 1910
 Bembidion ephippigerum (LeConte, 1852)
 Bembidion ephippium (Marsham, 1802)
 Bembidion epistomale (Jeannel, 1962)
 Bembidion equatoriale Van Dyke, 1953
 Bembidion eques Sturm, 1825
 Bembidion eregliense Jedlicka, 1961
 Bembidion erosum (Motschulsky, 1850)
 Bembidion errans Blackburn, 1888
 Bembidion erwini Perrault, 1982
 Bembidion escherichi Ganglbauer, 1897
 Bembidion espejoense Perrault, 1991
 Bembidion eucheres Netolitzky, 1943
 Bembidion eurydice Andrewes, 1926
 Bembidion eurygonum Bates, 1883
 Bembidion eutherum Andrewes, 1923
 Bembidion evanescens Wollaston, 1877
 Bembidion evidens Casey, 1918
 Bembidion exornatum Andrewes, 1930
 Bembidion exquisitum Andrewes, 1923

F

 Bembidion facchinii Toledano, 1998
 Bembidion falsum Blaisdell, 1902
 Bembidion farkaci Toledano & Sciaky, 1998
 Bembidion farrarae Hatch, 1950
 Bembidion fasciolatum (Duftschmid, 1812)
 Bembidion fassatii Jedlicka, 1951
 Bembidion fellmanni (Mannerheim, 1823)
 Bembidion femoratum Sturm, 1825
 Bembidion ferghanicum Müller-Motzfeld & Kryzhanovskij, 1983
 Bembidion fischeri Solier, 1849
 Bembidion flavescens Baehr, 1995
 Bembidion flavoposticatum du Val, 1855
 Bembidion flohri Bates, 1878
 Bembidion fluviatile Dejean, 1831
 Bembidion fontinale Raffray, 1886
 Bembidion foochowense Lindroth, 1980
 Bembidion foraminosum Sturm, 1825
 Bembidion foraticolle (Jeanne, 1995)
 Bembidion formosanum (Dupuis, 1912)
 Bembidion fortestriatum (Motschulsky, 1845)
 Bembidion fortunatum Wollaston, 1871
 Bembidion fossor Wollaston, 1877
 Bembidion foveatum W.J.MacLeay, 1871
 Bembidion foveolatum Dejean, 1831
 Bembidion foveum Motschulsky, 1844
 Bembidion francisci Neri & Gudenzi, 2013
 Bembidion franiae Erwin, 1982
 Bembidion franzi Fassati, 1957
 Bembidion fraxator Ménétriés, 1832
 Bembidion friebi Netolitzky, 1914
 Bembidion frontale (LeConte, 1847)
 Bembidion fuchsii Blaisdell, 1902
 Bembidion fugax (LeConte, 1848)
 Bembidion fujiyamai Habu, 1958
 Bembidion fulgens (Sharp, 1903)
 Bembidion fuliginosum Netolitzky, 1914
 Bembidion fulvipenne (Schuler, 1959)
 Bembidion fulvipes Sturm, 1827
 Bembidion fulvocinctum Bates, 1891
 Bembidion fumatum (Motschulsky, 1850)
 Bembidion fumigatum (Duftschmid, 1812)
 Bembidion fusiforme Netolitzky, 1914

G

 Bembidion gabrielianum Neri & Gudenzi, 2013
 Bembidion gabrielum (Bonniard de Saludo, 1970)
 Bembidion gagates Andrewes, 1924
 Bembidion gagneorum Liebherr, 2008
 Bembidion galapagoense (G.R.Waterhouse, 1845)
 Bembidion gansuense Jedlicka, 1965
 Bembidion gassneri Netolitzky, 1922
 Bembidion gautieri Netolitzky, 1921
 Bembidion gazella Antoine, 1925
 Bembidion geberti Marggi, 2011
 Bembidion gebieni Netolitzky, 1928
 Bembidion gebleri (Gebler, 1833)
 Bembidion gemmulipenne Wollaston, 1877
 Bembidion genei Küster, 1847
 Bembidion geniculatum Heer, 1837
 Bembidion geopearlis Sproul & Maddison, 2018
 Bembidion georgeballi Toledano, 2008
 Bembidion georgettae Perrault, 1982
 Bembidion gerdi Mikhailov, 1995
 Bembidion gerdmuelleri Toledano & Schmidt, 2010
 Bembidion germainianum Toledano, 2002
 Bembidion gersdorfi Fassati, 1957
 Bembidion ghilarovi Mikhailov, 1988
 Bembidion giganteum J.Sahlberg, 1900
 Bembidion gilae Lindroth, 1963
 Bembidion gilgit Andrewes, 1935
 Bembidion gilvipes Sturm, 1825
 Bembidion giselae Moret & Toledano, 2002
 Bembidion glabripenne Schmidt, 2018
 Bembidion glabrum (Motschulsky, 1850)
 Bembidion glaciale Heer, 1837
 Bembidion glasunovi Mikhailov, 1988
 Bembidion gobiense Jedlicka, 1964
 Bembidion goetzi Jedlicka, 1965
 Bembidion golem Toledano & Schmidt, 2008
 Bembidion gordoni Lindroth, 1963
 Bembidion gorilla Bonavita, Toledano & Taglianti, 2016
 Bembidion gotoense Habu, 1973
 Bembidion gotschii Chaudoir, 1846
 Bembidion graciliforme Hayward, 1897
 Bembidion gracilipenne Schmidt, 2018
 Bembidion grandiceps Hayward, 1897
 Bembidion grandipenne Schaum, 1862
 Bembidion granuliferum Lindroth, 1976
 Bembidion graphicum Casey, 1918
 Bembidion grapii Gyllenhal, 1827
 Bembidion gratiosum Casey, 1918
 Bembidion grayanum Wollaston, 1877
 Bembidion gredosanum (Jeanne, 1974)
 Bembidion grisvardi (Dewailly, 1949)
 Bembidion grosclaudei Normand, 1940
 Bembidion grossepunctatum Germain, 1906
 Bembidion guadarramense des Cottes, 1866
 Bembidion guamani Moret & Toledano, 2002
 Bembidion guaramacal Toledano, 2008
 Bembidion gudenzii (Neri, 1981)
 Bembidion guttula (Fabricius, 1792)
 Bembidion guttulatum Chaudoir, 1850
 Bembidion guttuloides De Monte, 1953
 Bembidion guzzettii Toledano, 2008

H

 Bembidion habui Jedlicka, 1965
 Bembidion hagai Morita, 2019
 Bembidion hageni Hayward, 1897
 Bembidion hajeki Toledano & Schmidt, 2008
 Bembidion haleakalae Liebherr, 2008
 Bembidion hamanense Jedlicka, 1933
 Bembidion hammondianum Müller-Motzfeld, 1988
 Bembidion hansi Jedlicka, 1932
 Bembidion haruspex Casey, 1918
 Bembidion hastii C.R.Sahlberg, 1827
 Bembidion hasurada Andrewes, 1924
 Bembidion hauserianum Netolitzky, 1918
 Bembidion havelkai Fassati, 1955
 Bembidion hayachinense Nakane, 1979
 Bembidion hebeicum Toledano, 2008
 Bembidion hebridarum Lindroth, 1980
 Bembidion heineri Toledano, 2011
 Bembidion heinzi Korge, 1971
 Bembidion heishuianum Toledano, 2008
 Bembidion herbertfranzi Toledano, 1998
 Bembidion hesperidum Wollaston, 1867
 Bembidion hesperium Fall, 1910
 Bembidion hetzeli Toledano & Schmidt, 2008
 Bembidion heydeni Ganglbauer, 1891
 Bembidion heyrovskyi Jedlicka, 1932
 Bembidion hiekei Müller-Motzfeld, 1986
 Bembidion hikosanum (Habu & Ueno, 1955)
 Bembidion himalayanum Andrewes, 1924
 Bembidion hiogoense Bates, 1873
 Bembidion hiranoi (Morita, 1996)
 Bembidion hirmocaelum Chaudoir, 1850
 Bembidion hirtipalposum Landin, 1955
 Bembidion hirtipes (Jeannel, 1962)
 Bembidion hispanicum Dejean, 1831
 Bembidion hissaricum Netolitzky, 1943
 Bembidion hittita Neri & Gudenzi, 2013
 Bembidion hoberlandti Jedlicka, 1951
 Bembidion hoberlandtianum Fassati, 1959
 Bembidion hokitikense Bates, 1878
 Bembidion holconotum Andrewes, 1935
 Bembidion honestum Say, 1823
 Bembidion hoogstraali Darlington, 1959
 Bembidion horii Morita, 2009
 Bembidion hornense (Jeannel, 1962)
 Bembidion horni Hayward, 1897
 Bembidion hosodai Morita, 2012
 Bembidion huberi Marggi, 2008
 Bembidion humboldtense Blaisdell, 1902
 Bembidion humboldti Moret & Toledano, 2002
 Bembidion humerale Sturm, 1825
 Bembidion hummleri G.Müller, 1918
 Bembidion hustachei Antoine, 1923
 Bembidion hyperboraeorum Munster, 1923
 Bembidion hypocrita Dejean, 1831
 Bembidion hysteron Netolitzky, 1943

I

 Bembidion iacobi Neri, 2017
 Bembidion ibericum de la Brûlerie, 1868
 Bembidion icterodes Alluaud, 1933
 Bembidion idoneum Casey, 1918
 Bembidion idriae Meschnigg, 1934
 Bembidion ignicola Blackburn, 1879
 Bembidion igorot Darlington, 1959
 Bembidion iliense Iablokoff-Khnzorian, 1970
 Bembidion illuchi Moret & Toledano, 2002
 Bembidion imereticum Belousov & Sokolov, 1996
 Bembidion immaturum Lindroth, 1954
 Bembidion impotens Casey, 1918
 Bembidion improvidens Casey, 1924
 Bembidion inaense Habu, 1956
 Bembidion inaequale Say, 1823
 Bembidion incisum Andrewes, 1921
 Bembidion incognitum G.Müller, 1931
 Bembidion incommodum Netolitzky, 1926
 Bembidion inconspicuum Wollaston, 1864
 Bembidion inconstans Solier, 1849
 Bembidion incrematum LeConte, 1860
 Bembidion indistinctum Dejean, 1831
 Bembidion infans Andrewes, 1930
 Bembidion infuscatipenne Netolitzky, 1938
 Bembidion infuscatum Dejean, 1831
 Bembidion innocuum Casey, 1918
 Bembidion inoptatum Schaum, 1857
 Bembidion insidiosum Solsky, 1874
 Bembidion insularum Andrewes, 1938
 Bembidion insulatum (LeConte, 1852)
 Bembidion integrum Casey, 1918
 Bembidion intermedium (Kirby, 1837)
 Bembidion interventor Lindroth, 1963
 Bembidion inventor Schmidt, 2018
 Bembidion ioheli Neri & Toledano, 2017
 Bembidion iphigenia Netolitzky, 1931
 Bembidion iricolor Bedel, 1879
 Bembidion iridescens (LeConte, 1852)
 Bembidion iridipenne Bousquet & Webster, 2006
 Bembidion irregulare Netolitzky, 1935
 Bembidion irroratum Reitter, 1891
 Bembidion ispartanum Netolitzky, 1930
 Bembidion israelita Ravizza, 1971
 Bembidion italicum De Monte, 1943
 Bembidion ivanloebli Neri & Toledano, 2018
 Bembidion ixtatan Erwin, 1982

J

 Bembidion jacksoniense Guérin-Méneville, 1830
 Bembidion jacobianum Casey, 1918
 Bembidion jacobseni Jensen-Haarup, 1910
 Bembidion jacobsoni Mikhailov, 1988
 Bembidion jacqueti (Jeannel, 1941)
 Bembidion jaechi Toledano, 2000
 Bembidion jamaicense Darlington, 1934
 Bembidion janatai Toledano, 2008
 Bembidion janczyki Neri & Toledano, 2020
 Bembidion jani Toledano, 1998
 Bembidion japonicum Jedlicka, 1961
 Bembidion jaroslavi Toledano & Schmidt, 2008
 Bembidion jeanneli Alluaud, 1939
 Bembidion jeannelicum Toledano, 2002
 Bembidion jedlickai Fassati, 1945
 Bembidion jelineki Toledano, 2009
 Bembidion jimburae Moret & Toledano, 2002
 Bembidion jintangi Toledano & Schmidt, 2008
 Bembidion joachimschmidti Toledano, 2008
 Bembidion josephi (Bonavita, 2001)
 Bembidion jucundum G.Horn, 1895
 Bembidion judaicum J.Sahlberg, 1908
 Bembidion julianum De Monte, 1943
 Bembidion justinae Meschnigg, 1947

K

 Bembidion kabakovi Mikhailov, 1984
 Bembidion kafiristanum Neri & Toledano, 2020
 Bembidion kaloprosopon Toledano & Sciaky, 2004
 Bembidion kalumae Lindroth, 1963
 Bembidion kamakou Liebherr, 2008
 Bembidion kamikochii Jedlicka, 1965
 Bembidion kara Andrewes, 1921
 Bembidion kareli Toledano, 2008
 Bembidion karikari Larochelle & Larivière, 2015
 Bembidion karinae Schmidt, 2009
 Bembidion kartalinicum Lutshnik, 1938
 Bembidion kasaharai (Habu, 1978)
 Bembidion kaschmirense Netolitzky, 1920
 Bembidion kauaiensis (Sharp, 1903)
 Bembidion kazakhstanicum Kryzhanovskij, 1979
 Bembidion kempi Andrewes, 1922
 Bembidion kenyense Alluaud, 1917
 Bembidion kermanum (Bonavita & Rebl, 2013)
 Bembidion khanakense Mikhailov, 1984
 Bembidion khuchuchani Toledano, 2008
 Bembidion kilimanum Alluaud, 1908
 Bembidion kimurai Morita, 2008
 Bembidion kiritshenkoi Mikhailov, 1984
 Bembidion kirschenhoferi (Müller-Motzfeld, 1988)
 Bembidion kishimotoi (Morita, 1996)
 Bembidion kivuanum (Basilewsky, 1951)
 Bembidion klapperichi Jedlicka, 1953
 Bembidion klapperichianum Fassati, 1957
 Bembidion klausnitzeri Schmidt & Marggi, 2014
 Bembidion klimai Neri & Gudenzi, 2013
 Bembidion kmecoi Toledano & Nakladal, 2011
 Bembidion koebelei (Sharp, 1903)
 Bembidion koikei Habu & Baba, 1960
 Bembidion kokandicum Solsky, 1874
 Bembidion kolbei C.Bruch, 1808
 Bembidion komareki Fassati, 1955
 Bembidion kryzhanovskii Mikhailov, 1988
 Bembidion kucerai Toledano, 2008
 Bembidion kuesteri Schaum, 1845
 Bembidion kuhitangi Mikhailov & Belousov, 1991
 Bembidion kulzeri Netolitzky, 1935
 Bembidion kunarense Kirschenhofer, 1989
 Bembidion kuprianovii Mannerheim, 1843
 Bembidion kurdistanicum Netolitzky, 1920
 Bembidion kurram Andrewes, 1935
 Bembidion kuscheli (Jeannel, 1962)
 Bembidion kuznetsovi Lafer, 2002
 Bembidion kyros Netolitzky, 1931

L

 Bembidion lachnophoroides Darlington, 1926
 Bembidion lacrimans Netolitzky, 1935
 Bembidion lacunarium (Zimmermann, 1869)
 Bembidion ladas Andrewes, 1924
 Bembidion laetum Brullé, 1836
 Bembidion laevibase (Reitter, 1902)
 Bembidion laevipenne G.Müller, 1918
 Bembidion lafertei du Val, 1852
 Bembidion lais Bedel, 1900
 Bembidion lamproides Netolitzky, 1920
 Bembidion lampros (Herbst, 1784)
 Bembidion lapponicum Zetterstedt, 1828
 Bembidion lares Toledano, 2008
 Bembidion latebricola Casey, 1918
 Bembidion laterale (Samouelle, 1819)
 Bembidion laticeps (LeConte, 1858)
 Bembidion laticolle (Duftschmid, 1812)
 Bembidion latinum Netolitzky, 1911
 Bembidion latiplaga Chaudoir, 1850
 Bembidion laurentii Neri & Gudenzi, 2013
 Bembidion lavernae Erwin, 1982
 Bembidion laxatum Casey, 1918
 Bembidion lecontei Csiki, 1928
 Bembidion leleupi (Basilewsky, 1954)
 Bembidion lenae Csiki, 1928
 Bembidion leonense Jeanne & Müller-Motzfeld, 1982
 Bembidion leonhardi Netolitzky, 1909
 Bembidion leptaleum Andrewes, 1922
 Bembidion leucolenum Bates, 1873
 Bembidion leucoscelis Chaudoir, 1850
 Bembidion leve Andrewes, 1924
 Bembidion levettei Casey, 1918
 Bembidion leytense Baehr, 1995
 Bembidion lhai Schmidt, 2018
 Bembidion lhatseense Schmidt, 2018
 Bembidion liangi Toledano & Schmidt, 2008
 Bembidion liliputanum (J.Sahlberg, 1908)
 Bembidion limatum Andrewes, 1924
 Bembidion linauense Müller-Motzfeld, 1988
 Bembidion liparum Andrewes, 1936
 Bembidion lirykense Reitter, 1908
 Bembidion lissonotoides Kirschenhofer, 1989
 Bembidion lissonotum Bates, 1873
 Bembidion litorale (Olivier, 1790)
 Bembidion livens Andrewes, 1930
 Bembidion lividulum Casey, 1918
 Bembidion lobanovi Mikhailov, 1984
 Bembidion loebli Schmidt, 2014
 Bembidion loeffleri Jedlicka, 1963
 Bembidion lonae Jensen-Haarup, 1910
 Bembidion longipenne Putzeys, 1845
 Bembidion longipes K.Daniel, 1902
 Bembidion longriba Toledano & Schmidt, 2008
 Bembidion lorenzi Toledano, 2002
 Bembidion loricatum Andrewes, 1922
 Bembidion lorquinii Chaudoir, 1868
 Bembidion loscondesi Toledano, 2002
 Bembidion louisella Maddison, 2008
 Bembidion lucifugum (Neri & Pavesi, 1989)
 Bembidion lucillum Bates, 1883
 Bembidion luculentum Casey, 1918
 Bembidion lugubre LeConte, 1857
 Bembidion luhuoense Toledano, 1998
 Bembidion luisae Toledano, 2000
 Bembidion lulinense Habu, 1973
 Bembidion lunatum (Duftschmid, 1812)
 Bembidion lunepabomaguvi Schmidt, 2018
 Bembidion luniferum Andrewes, 1924
 Bembidion lunulatum (Geoffroy, 1785)
 Bembidion luridicorne Solsky, 1874
 Bembidion luristanicum Neri & Toledano, 2018
 Bembidion luteipes (Motschulsky, 1844)
 Bembidion lysander Andrewes, 1935

M

 Bembidion mackinderi Alluaud, 1917
 Bembidion macrogonum Bates, 1891
 Bembidion macropterum J.Sahlberg, 1880
 Bembidion maculatum Dejean, 1831
 Bembidion maculiferum Gemminger & Harold, 1868
 Bembidion madagascariense Chaudoir, 1876
 Bembidion maddisoni Toledano, 2000
 Bembidion magellense Schauberger, 1922
 Bembidion magrinii Toledano, 2011
 Bembidion mallmaense Toledano, 2008
 Bembidion mandarin Netolitzky, 1939
 Bembidion mandibulare Solier, 1849
 Bembidion manfredschmidi Kirschenhofer, 1985
 Bembidion mangamuka Larochelle & Larivière, 2015
 Bembidion manicatum Andrewes, 1935
 Bembidion mannerheimii C.R.Sahlberg, 1827
 Bembidion manningense Lindroth, 1969
 Bembidion maorinum Bates, 1867
 Bembidion marggii Schmidt, 2004
 Bembidion marginatum Solier, 1849
 Bembidion marginipenne Solsky, 1874
 Bembidion maritimum (Stephens, 1839)
 Bembidion maroccanum Antoine, 1923
 Bembidion martachemai (Toribio, 2002)
 Bembidion marthae Reitter, 1902
 Bembidion marussii De Monte, 1956
 Bembidion massaicum (Antoine, 1962)
 Bembidion mastersi Sloane, 1895
 Bembidion mathani Moret & Toledano, 2002
 Bembidion mauritii (Bonavita & Taglianti, 2010)
 Bembidion mckinleyi Fall, 1926
 Bembidion megalops (Wollaston, 1877)
 Bembidion melanoceroides Toledano, Bonavita & Schmidt, 2021
 Bembidion melanocerum Chaudoir, 1876
 Bembidion melanopodum Solier, 1849
 Bembidion mellissii Wollaston, 1869
 Bembidion menander Andrewes, 1935
 Bembidion mendocinum Jensen-Haarup, 1910
 Bembidion menetriesii (Kolenati, 1845)
 Bembidion meruanum (Basilewsky, 1962)
 Bembidion merum Jedlicka, 1933
 Bembidion mesasiaticum Mikhailov, 1988
 Bembidion meschniggi Netolitzky, 1943
 Bembidion mexicanum Dejean, 1831
 Bembidion mikitjukovi Mikhailov, 1997
 Bembidion mikyskai Toledano & Schmidt, 2008
 Bembidion milleri du Val, 1852
 Bembidion milosfassatii Schmidt, 2004
 Bembidion mimbres Maddison, 2020
 Bembidion mimekara Toledano & Schmidt, 2010
 Bembidion mimus Hayward, 1897
 Bembidion mingrelicum Belousov & Sokolov, 1994
 Bembidion minimum (Fabricius, 1792)
 Bembidion minoum C.Huber & Marggi, 1997
 Bembidion mirasoi Jensen-Haarup, 1910
 Bembidion mirzayani (Morvan, 1973)
 Bembidion misellum Harold, 1877
 Bembidion miwai Jedlicka, 1946
 Bembidion mixtum Schaum, 1863
 Bembidion modestum (Fabricius, 1801)
 Bembidion modocianum Casey, 1924
 Bembidion montanum Rambur, 1838
 Bembidion montei Fassati, 1959
 Bembidion monticola Sturm, 1825
 Bembidion morawitzi Csiki, 1928
 Bembidion moreti Toledano, 2008
 Bembidion moritai Toledano, 2000
 Bembidion mormon Hayward, 1897
 Bembidion morulum LeConte, 1863
 Bembidion morvanianum Müller-Motzfeld, 1986
 Bembidion motschulskyi Csiki, 1928
 Bembidion motzfeldi Belousov & Sokolov, 1994
 Bembidion m-signatum Jensen-Haarup, 1910
 Bembidion mucubaji Perrault, 1991
 Bembidion muellermotzfeldi Toledano, 2000
 Bembidion muemo Rebl & Toledano, 2014
 Bembidion muilwijki Neri & Toledano, 2017
 Bembidion multipunctatum (Motschulsky, 1850)
 Bembidion mundatum Netolitzky, 1920
 Bembidion mundum (LeConte, 1852)
 Bembidion munroi (Sharp, 1903)
 Bembidion murrilloense Toledano, 2008
 Bembidion mus Netolitzky, 1931
 Bembidion musae Broun, 1882
 Bembidion muscicola Hayward, 1897
 Bembidion mutatum Gemminger & Harold, 1868

N

 Bembidion nahuala Erwin, 1982
 Bembidion nakamurai (Morita, 2008)
 Bembidion namtso Schmidt, 2018
 Bembidion narzikulovi Kryzhanovskij, 1972
 Bembidion nebraskense LeConte, 1863
 Bembidion negreanum Toledano, 2002
 Bembidion negrei Habu, 1958
 Bembidion nemrutdagi Toledano & Rebl, 2006
 Bembidion neocoerulescens Bousquet, 1993
 Bembidion neodelamarei Toledano, 2008
 Bembidion neresheimeri G.Müller, 1929
 Bembidion nerii Toledano, 2008
 Bembidion netolitzkyanum Schatzmayr, 1940
 Bembidion netolitzkyi Krausse, 1910
 Bembidion nevadense Ulke, 1875
 Bembidion nigricorne Gyllenhal, 1827
 Bembidion nigripes (Kirby, 1837)
 Bembidion nigritum Solier, 1849
 Bembidion nigrivestis Bousquet, 2006
 Bembidion nigrocoeruleum Hayward, 1897
 Bembidion nigropiceum (Marsham, 1802)
 Bembidion nigrum Say, 1823
 Bembidion niloticum Dejean, 1831
 Bembidion nipponicum (Habu & Ueno, 1955)
 Bembidion nirasawai Morita, 2008
 Bembidion nisekoense Morita, 2019
 Bembidion nishidai Morita, 2009
 Bembidion nitidicolle Bousquet, 2006
 Bembidion nitidum (Kirby, 1837)
 Bembidion nivicola Andrewes, 1923
 Bembidion nobile Rottenberg, 1870
 Bembidion nogalesium Casey, 1924
 Bembidion nonaginta Toledano, 2008
 Bembidion normannum Dejean, 1831
 Bembidion notatum Andrewes, 1922
 Bembidion nubiculosum Chaudoir, 1868
 Bembidion nubigena Wollaston, 1877
 Bembidion nudipenne Lindroth, 1963
 Bembidion nuncaestimatum Netolitzky, 1939
 Bembidion nuristanum Neri & Toledano, 2020

O

 Bembidion obenbergeri Lutshnik, 1928
 Bembidion oberthueri Hayward, 1901
 Bembidion obliquulum LeConte, 1859
 Bembidion obliquum Sturm, 1825
 Bembidion obliteratum Solier, 1849
 Bembidion obscurellum (Motschulsky, 1845)
 Bembidion obscuripenne Blaisdell, 1902
 Bembidion obscuromaculatum (Motschulsky, 1859)
 Bembidion obtusangulum LeConte, 1863
 Bembidion obtusidens Fall, 1922
 Bembidion obtusum Audinet-Serville, 1821
 Bembidion occultator Notman, 1920
 Bembidion ochsi (Schuler, 1959)
 Bembidion octomaculatum (Goeze, 1777)
 Bembidion ocylum Jedlicka, 1933
 Bembidion ohkurai Morita, 1992
 Bembidion ohtsukai (Morita, 1996)
 Bembidion okavangum (Bonavita & Taglianti, 2021)
 Bembidion okinawanum (Morita, 2009)
 Bembidion olegleonidovici Fassati, 1990
 Bembidion olemartini Kirschenhofer, 1984
 Bembidion olympicum De Monte, 1946
 Bembidion onorei Moret & Toledano, 2002
 Bembidion onsen Morita, 2010
 Bembidion operosum Casey, 1918
 Bembidion oppressum Casey, 1918
 Bembidion opulentum Nietner, 1858
 Bembidion orbiferum Bates, 1878
 Bembidion oregonense Hatch, 1953
 Bembidion orinum Andrewes, 1922
 Bembidion orion Cooper & Maddison, 2014
 Bembidion oromaia Sproul & Maddison, 2018
 Bembidion orregoi Germain, 1906
 Bembidion ortsi Netolitzky, 1938
 Bembidion ovale (Motschulsky, 1844)
 Bembidion ovalipenne (Solsky, 1874)
 Bembidion ovoideum Marggi & C.Huber, 1999
 Bembidion ovulum Netolitzky, 1910
 Bembidion oxapampa Toledano, 2008
 Bembidion oxyglymma Bates, 1883
 Bembidion ozakii Morita, 2010
 Bembidion ozarkense Maddison & Hildebrandt, 2011

P

 Bembidion pacificum Blackburn, 1878
 Bembidion paediscum Bates, 1883
 Bembidion paganettii Netolitzky, 1914
 Bembidion pallideguttula Jensen-Haarup, 1910
 Bembidion pallidicorne G.Müller, 1921
 Bembidion pallidipenne (Illiger, 1802)
 Bembidion pallidiveste Carret, 1905
 Bembidion palosverdes Kavanaugh & Erwin, 1992
 Bembidion pamiricola Lutshnik, 1930
 Bembidion panda Toledano, 2000
 Bembidion paracomplanatum Nitzu, 1995
 Bembidion paraenulum Maddison, 2009
 Bembidion parallelipenne Chaudoir, 1850
 Bembidion paralongulum Toledano, 2002
 Bembidion paratomarium Liebherr, 2008
 Bembidion parconaturaviva Toledano & Schmidt, 2010
 Bembidion parepum Jedlicka, 1933
 Bembidion parsorum Netolitzky, 1934
 Bembidion parviceps Bates, 1878
 Bembidion parvum (Jeannel, 1962)
 Bembidion pascoense Toledano, 2008
 Bembidion patris Schmidt, 2010
 Bembidion patruele Dejean, 1831
 Bembidion paulinae Moret & Toledano, 2002
 Bembidion paulinoi Heyden, 1870
 Bembidion pavesii Toledano & Schmidt, 2008
 Bembidion pedestre (Motschulsky, 1844)
 Bembidion pedicellatum LeConte, 1857
 Bembidion peleum Jedlicka, 1933
 Bembidion peliopterum Chaudoir, 1850
 Bembidion penai Toledano, 2002
 Bembidion penninum Netolitzky, 1918
 Bembidion perbrevicolle Casey, 1924
 Bembidion perditum Netolitzky, 1920
 Bembidion perkinsi (Sharp, 1903)
 Bembidion pernotum Casey, 1918
 Bembidion perraulti Moret & Toledano, 2002
 Bembidion persephone Andrewes, 1926
 Bembidion persicum Ménétriés, 1832
 Bembidion persimile A.Morawitz, 1862
 Bembidion perspicuum (LeConte, 1848)
 Bembidion peruvianum Brèthes, 1920
 Bembidion peterseni Jensen-Haarup, 1910
 Bembidion petrimagni Netolitzky, 1920
 Bembidion petrosum Gebler, 1833
 Bembidion pfizenmayeri Netolitzky, 1943
 Bembidion phaedrum Andrewes, 1923
 Bembidion philippii Germain, 1906
 Bembidion phoeniceum C.Huber & Marggi, 1997
 Bembidion phryganobium Belousov & Sokolov, 1996
 Bembidion piceocyaneum Solsky, 1874
 Bembidion pichincha Toledano, 2008
 Bembidion picturatum Fairmaire, 1898
 Bembidion pieroi Toledano, 2000
 Bembidion pierrei Toledano, 2008
 Bembidion pilatei Chaudoir, 1868
 Bembidion pimanum Casey, 1918
 Bembidion pindicum Apfelbeck, 1901
 Bembidion pinkeri Netolitzky, 1935
 Bembidion pinnigerum Schmidt, 2018
 Bembidion placeranum Casey, 1924
 Bembidion placitum Bates, 1878
 Bembidion plagiatum (Zimmermann, 1869)
 Bembidion planatum (LeConte, 1847)
 Bembidion planiusculum Mannerheim, 1843
 Bembidion planum (Haldeman, 1843)
 Bembidion platyderoides (Wollaston, 1877)
 Bembidion platynoides Hayward, 1897
 Bembidion platypterum (Solsky, 1874)
 Bembidion pliculatum Bates, 1883
 Bembidion plutenkoi Toledano, 2008
 Bembidion pluto Andrewes, 1924
 Bembidion poculare Bates, 1884
 Bembidion pogonoides Bates, 1883
 Bembidion pogonopsis Alluaud, 1933
 Bembidion poli Toledano & Sciaky, 2004
 Bembidion politum (Motschulsky, 1845)
 Bembidion poppii Netolitzky, 1914
 Bembidion portoricense Darlington, 1939
 Bembidion posticale Germain, 1906
 Bembidion postremum Say, 1830
 Bembidion praeceptor Schmidt, 2018
 Bembidion praecinctum LeConte, 1879
 Bembidion praeustum Dejean, 1831
 Bembidion prasinum (Duftschmid, 1812)
 Bembidion praticola Lindroth, 1963
 Bembidion problematicum Schmidt, 2018
 Bembidion prokopenkoi Mikhailov, 1995
 Bembidion properans (Stephens, 1828)
 Bembidion proportionale Jensen-Haarup, 1910
 Bembidion proprium Blackburn, 1888
 Bembidion proteron Netolitzky, 1920
 Bembidion pseudascendens Manderbach & Müller-Motzfeld, 2004
 Bembidion pseudocautum Lindroth, 1963
 Bembidion pseudoclarum Schmidt, 2018
 Bembidion pseudocyaneum Belousov & Sokolov, 1994
 Bembidion pseudokara Toledano & Schmidt, 2010
 Bembidion pseudolucillum Netolitzky, 1938
 Bembidion pseudosiebkei Kirschenhofer, 1984
 Bembidion pseudovale Toledano, 2008
 Bembidion psilodorum Andrewes, 1933
 Bembidion psuchrum Andrewes, 1922
 Bembidion pulcherrimum (Motschulsky, 1850)
 Bembidion punctatellum (Motschulsky, 1844)
 Bembidion punctatostriatum Say, 1823
 Bembidion punctigerum Solier, 1849
 Bembidion punctulatum Drapiez, 1820
 Bembidion punctulipenne Bates, 1878
 Bembidion puponga Larochelle & Larivière, 2015
 Bembidion purkynei Jedlicka, 1932
 Bembidion purulha Erwin, 1982
 Bembidion putzeysi Csiki, 1928
 Bembidion pygmaeum (Fabricius, 1792)
 Bembidion pyrenaeum Dejean, 1831
 Bembidion pyxidum Moret & Toledano, 2002

Q

 Bembidion qinghaicum Toledano, 1998
 Bembidion quadratulum Notman, 1920
 Bembidion quadricolle (Motschulsky, 1844)
 Bembidion quadrifossulatum Schaum, 1862
 Bembidion quadrifoveolatum Mannerheim, 1843
 Bembidion quadriimpressum (Motschulsky, 1860)
 Bembidion quadrimaculatum (Linnaeus, 1760)
 Bembidion quadriplagiatum (Motschulsky, 1844)
 Bembidion quadripustulatum Audinet-Serville, 1821
 Bembidion quadrulum LeConte, 1861
 Bembidion quailaicum Kirschenhofer, 1984
 Bembidion quebrada Toledano, 2008
 Bembidion quetzal Erwin, 1982

R

 Bembidion radians Andrewes, 1922
 Bembidion rapidum (LeConte, 1847)
 Bembidion rapola Toledano, 2008
 Bembidion rawlinsi Moret & Toledano, 2002
 Bembidion rebeccae Toledano, 1998
 Bembidion rebeccanum Toledano, 2008
 Bembidion rebli Toledano, 2008
 Bembidion rectangulum du Val, 1852
 Bembidion recticolle LeConte, 1863
 Bembidion regale Andrewes, 1922
 Bembidion regismontium Netolitzky, 1943
 Bembidion reibnitzi Schmidt, 2018
 Bembidion reichardti Lutshnik, 1930
 Bembidion reiseri Apfelbeck, 1902
 Bembidion relictum K.Daniel, 1902
 Bembidion renei Toledano, 2002
 Bembidion rengense Morita, 2009
 Bembidion renoanum Casey, 1918
 Bembidion retingense Schmidt, 2018
 Bembidion retipenne G.Müller, 1918
 Bembidion reuteri Neri & Toledano, 2020
 Bembidion rhaeticum Heer, 1837
 Bembidion rhodopense Apfelbeck, 1902
 Bembidion ricei Maddison & Toledano, 2012
 Bembidion rickmersi Reitter, 1898
 Bembidion rilong Toledano & Schmidt, 2008
 Bembidion ringueleti (Jeannel, 1962)
 Bembidion rionicum Müller-Motzfeld, 1983
 Bembidion ripicola L.Dufour, 1820
 Bembidion roberti Toledano, 2000
 Bembidion roborowskii Mikhailov, 1988
 Bembidion robusticolle Hayward, 1897
 Bembidion rogersi Bates, 1878
 Bembidion rohanum Neri & Toledano, 2017
 Bembidion rolandi Fall, 1922
 Bembidion ronfelixi Neri & Toledano, 2017
 Bembidion roosevelti Pic, 1902
 Bembidion rosslandicum Lindroth, 1963
 Bembidion rothfelsi Maddison, 2008
 Bembidion rotundicolle Bates, 1874
 Bembidion rubiginosum LeConte, 1879
 Bembidion rucillum Darlington, 1939
 Bembidion rude (Sharp, 1903)
 Bembidion ruffoi Toledano & Schmidt, 2008
 Bembidion ruficolle (Panzer, 1796)
 Bembidion rufimacula G.Müller, 1918
 Bembidion rufinum Lindroth, 1963
 Bembidion rufoplagiatum Germain, 1906
 Bembidion rufosuffusum Wollaston, 1877
 Bembidion rufotibiellum Fairmaire, 1888
 Bembidion rufotinctum Chaudoir, 1868
 Bembidion rufum Mikhailov, 1996
 Bembidion rugicolle Reiche & Saulcy, 1855
 Bembidion rugosellum (Jeannel, 1962)
 Bembidion rupicola (Kirby, 1837)
 Bembidion ruruy Makarov & Sundukov, 2014
 Bembidion rusticum Casey, 1918
 Bembidion ruthenum Tschitscherine, 1895
 Bembidion ruwenzoricum Alluaud, 1933
 Bembidion ryei Jensen-Haarup, 1910

S

 Bembidion saitoi Morita, 2009
 Bembidion sajanum Shilenkov, 1995
 Bembidion salebratum (LeConte, 1847)
 Bembidion salinarium Casey, 1918
 Bembidion salweenum Schmidt, 2014
 Bembidion samai Neri & Toledano, 2017
 Bembidion sanandresi Toledano, 2002
 Bembidion sanatum Bates, 1883
 Bembidion sanctaemarthae Darlington, 1934
 Bembidion saragurense Moret & Toledano, 2002
 Bembidion sarpedon Casey, 1918
 Bembidion satanas Andrewes, 1924
 Bembidion satelles Casey, 1918
 Bembidion satellites Bates, 1884
 Bembidion satoi Morita, 1993
 Bembidion saturatum Casey, 1918
 Bembidion sauteri (Jedlicka, 1954)
 Bembidion saxatile Gyllenhal, 1827
 Bembidion scandens Landin, 1955
 Bembidion scapulare Dejean, 1831
 Bembidion scelio (Antoine, 1945)
 Bembidion scenicum Casey, 1918
 Bembidion schermanni Kirschenhofer, 1985
 Bembidion schillhammeri Toledano, 1998
 Bembidion schmidti Wollaston, 1854
 Bembidion schnitteri Neri & Toledano, 2017
 Bembidion schoedli Toledano, 2005
 Bembidion schoenmanni Toledano, 2000
 Bembidion schuelkei Toledano, 2000
 Bembidion schueppelii Dejean, 1831
 Bembidion sciakyi Toledano, 1999
 Bembidion scintillans Bates, 1882
 Bembidion scitulum Erichson, 1834
 Bembidion sclanoi (Magrini, 1996)
 Bembidion scopulinum (Kirby, 1837)
 Bembidion scotti Netolitzky, 1931
 Bembidion scottustulatum Netolitzky, 1937
 Bembidion scudderi LeConte, 1878
 Bembidion sculpturatum (Motschulsky, 1859)
 Bembidion scythicum K.Daniel, 1902
 Bembidion seijii Toledano, 2009
 Bembidion sejunctum Casey, 1918
 Bembidion semenovi Lindroth, 1965
 Bembidion semibraccatum Netolitzky, 1911
 Bembidion semicinctum Notman, 1919
 Bembidion semifasciatum Say, 1830
 Bembidion semilotum Netolitzky, 1911
 Bembidion semilunium Netolitzky, 1914
 Bembidion seminskiense Shilenkov, 1990
 Bembidion semiopacum Casey, 1924
 Bembidion semipunctatum (Donovan, 1806)
 Bembidion semistriatum (Haldeman, 1843)
 Bembidion sengleti Toledano & Marggi, 2007
 Bembidion seriatum (Motschulsky, 1844)
 Bembidion serpentinum Landin, 1955
 Bembidion servillei Solier, 1849
 Bembidion seticorne Lindroth, 1980
 Bembidion sexfoveatum Germain, 1906
 Bembidion shepherdae Maddison, 2020
 Bembidion shibatai Morita, 2008
 Bembidion shikokuense (Morita, 1996)
 Bembidion shilenkovi Morita, 1989
 Bembidion shimoyamai Habu, 1978
 Bembidion shugela Toledano, 2000
 Bembidion shunichii Habu, 1973
 Bembidion sibiricum Dejean, 1831
 Bembidion siculum Dejean, 1831
 Bembidion sierricola Casey, 1924
 Bembidion signatipenne du Val, 1852
 Bembidion sillemi Netolitzky, 1935
 Bembidion silvicola (Jeannel, 1962)
 Bembidion simplex Hayward, 1897
 Bembidion sinicum Andrewes, 1938
 Bembidion sinuosum Schmidt & Marggi, 2014
 Bembidion sirinae Moret & Toledano, 2002
 Bembidion siticum Casey, 1918
 Bembidion sjolanderi Jedlicka, 1965
 Bembidion sjostedti Alluaud, 1927
 Bembidion skoraszewskyi Korge, 1971
 Bembidion smaragdinum (Sharp, 1903)
 Bembidion smetanai Toledano & Schmidt, 2008
 Bembidion smirnovi Kryzhanovskij, 1979
 Bembidion soederbomi Jedlicka, 1965
 Bembidion sogdianum Belousov & Mikhailov, 1990
 Bembidion sokolowskii Fassati, 1957
 Bembidion solanum Jedlicka, 1965
 Bembidion solieri Gemminger & Harold, 1868
 Bembidion solitarium Lindroth, 1976
 Bembidion solskyi Netolitzky, 1934
 Bembidion sordidum (Kirby, 1837)
 Bembidion sparsum Bates, 1882
 Bembidion speciense Jedlicka, 1932
 Bembidion sphaeroderum Bates, 1882
 Bembidion sphaeruliferum Bates, 1891
 Bembidion spinolai Solier, 1849
 Bembidion splendens Andrewes, 1923
 Bembidion splendidum Sturm, 1825
 Bembidion spretum Dejean, 1831
 Bembidion spurcum Blackburn, 1881
 Bembidion staneki Maran, 1932
 Bembidion starkii Schaum, 1860
 Bembidion steinbuehleri Ganglbauer, 1891
 Bembidion steini Netolitzky, 1914
 Bembidion stenoderum Bates, 1873
 Bembidion stephensii Crotch, 1866
 Bembidion sterbai Jedlicka, 1965
 Bembidion stewartense Lindroth, 1976
 Bembidion stillaguamish Hatch, 1950
 Bembidion stolfai G.Müller, 1943
 Bembidion storkianum Müller-Motzfeld, 1988
 Bembidion straussi Netolitzky, 1910
 Bembidion striaticeps Andrewes, 1935
 Bembidion striatum (Fabricius, 1792)
 Bembidion stricticolle Germain, 1906
 Bembidion strictum (Schuler, 1962)
 Bembidion striola (LeConte, 1852)
 Bembidion subaerarium Casey, 1924
 Bembidion subangustatum Hayward, 1897
 Bembidion subapterum Darlington, 1934
 Bembidion subcostatum (Motschulsky, 1850)
 Bembidion subcylindricum Reitter, 1892
 Bembidion subfasciatum Chaudoir, 1850
 Bembidion subflavescens (Antoine, 1945)
 Bembidion subfusum Darlington, 1959
 Bembidion subimpressum Kirschenhofer, 1989
 Bembidion sublimbatum Wollaston, 1877
 Bembidion submaculatum Bates, 1878
 Bembidion submutatum Netolitzky, 1911
 Bembidion suensoni Kirschenhofer, 1984
 Bembidion sulcicolle J.Sahlberg, 1880
 Bembidion sulcipenne J.Sahlberg, 1880
 Bembidion sulfurarium Moret & Toledano, 2002
 Bembidion sumaoi Morita, 1981
 Bembidion suturale Motschulsky, 1850
 Bembidion syropalaestinum (Bonavita & Taglianti, 2010)

T

 Bembidion tabellatum Wollaston, 1854
 Bembidion taguense Toledano, 2000
 Bembidion tahitiense Liebherr & Maddison, 2013
 Bembidion tairuense Bates, 1878
 Bembidion taiwanum Netolitzky, 1939
 Bembidion taiyuanense Kirschenhofer, 1984
 Bembidion takasagonis Habu, 1973
 Bembidion tambra Andrewes, 1923
 Bembidion tauricum G.Müller, 1918
 Bembidion tekapoense Broun, 1886
 Bembidion tencenti Hatch, 1951
 Bembidion tenellum Erichson, 1837
 Bembidion tepaki Larochelle & Larivière, 2015
 Bembidion teradai Toledano, 2009
 Bembidion teres Blackburn, 1881
 Bembidion tergluense Netolitzky, 1918
 Bembidion terminale Heer, 1841
 Bembidion terryerwini Neri & Toledano, 2021
 Bembidion tesselatum Brullé, 1843
 Bembidion testaceum (Duftschmid, 1812)
 Bembidion testatum Casey, 1918
 Bembidion tethys Netolitzky, 1926
 Bembidion tetracolum Say, 1823
 Bembidion tetragrammum Chaudoir, 1846
 Bembidion tetrapholeon Maddison, 2014
 Bembidion tetraporum Bates, 1883
 Bembidion tetrasemum Chaudoir, 1846
 Bembidion texanum Chaudoir, 1868
 Bembidion tibiale (Duftschmid, 1812)
 Bembidion tigrinum LeConte, 1879
 Bembidion tillyardi (Brookes, 1927)
 Bembidion timidum (LeConte, 1847)
 Bembidion tinctum Zetterstedt, 1828
 Bembidion tokunoshimanum (Nakane, 1956)
 Bembidion tolbonuri Müller-Motzfeld, 1984
 Bembidion toledanoi Schmidt, 2004
 Bembidion toledanoianum Echaroux, 2008
 Bembidion topali (Nègre, 1973)
 Bembidion torosum Marggi & C.Huber, 1999
 Bembidion toubkalense Bonavita & Taglianti, 2018
 Bembidion townsendi Lindroth, 1976
 Bembidion toyodai Morita, 2009
 Bembidion trabzonicum Belousov & Sokolov, 1994
 Bembidion transcaucasicum Lutshnik, 1938
 Bembidion transhimalayanum Schmidt, 2018
 Bembidion transparens (Gebler, 1830)
 Bembidion transsylvanicum Bielz, 1852
 Bembidion transversale Dejean, 1831
 Bembidion transversum G.Müller, 1918
 Bembidion trebinjense Apfelbeck, 1899
 Bembidion trechiforme (LeConte, 1852)
 Bembidion trechoides Wollaston, 1877
 Bembidion tricuspis Neri & Toledano, 2018
 Bembidion triviale Casey, 1918
 Bembidion tropicale (Bruneau de Miré, 1952)
 Bembidion tropicum Chaudoir, 1876
 Bembidion tsutsuii (Ueno, 1954)
 Bembidion tucumanum (Jeannel, 1962)
 Bembidion tunuyanense Jensen-Haarup, 1910
 Bembidion turcicum Gemminger & Harold, 1868
 Bembidion turnai Toledano, 1998
 Bembidion turquinum Darlington, 1937

U

 Bembidion uenoianum (Morita, 1996)
 Bembidion ugartei Toledano, 2002
 Bembidion uhligi Toledano & Maddison, 2016
 Bembidion ulkei Lindroth, 1963
 Bembidion umbratum (LeConte, 1847)
 Bembidion umeyai Habu, 1959
 Bembidion umi Sasakawa, 2007
 Bembidion umiatense Lindroth, 1963
 Bembidion unifasciatum (de Saludo, 1970)
 Bembidion uniforme Csiki, 1928
 Bembidion urarteum Neri & Toledano, 2017
 Bembidion urewerense Lindroth, 1976
 Bembidion uruguayense Csiki, 1928
 Bembidion ustum (Quensel, 1806)

V

 Bembidion vaillanti (Schuler, 1956)
 Bembidion validum Netolitzky, 1920
 Bembidion vandykei Blaisdell, 1902
 Bembidion varicolor (Fabricius, 1803)
 Bembidion variegatum Say, 1823
 Bembidion variola Netolitzky, 1910
 Bembidion variolatum Mikhailov, 1983
 Bembidion varium (Olivier, 1795)
 Bembidion velox (Linnaeus, 1760)
 Bembidion veneriatum (Normand, 1946)
 Bembidion vernale Bates, 1882
 Bembidion versicolor (LeConte, 1847)
 Bembidion versutum LeConte, 1878
 Bembidion vespertinum Casey, 1918
 Bembidion viator Casey, 1918
 Bembidion vicinum Lucas, 1846
 Bembidion viduum Netolitzky, 1910
 Bembidion vignai Moret & Toledano, 2002
 Bembidion vile (LeConte, 1852)
 Bembidion villagomesi Moret & Toledano, 2002
 Bembidion virens Gyllenhal, 1827
 Bembidion viridicolle (LaFerté-Sénectère, 1841)
 Bembidion vitalisi Andrewes, 1921
 Bembidion vitiosum Gemminger & Harold, 1868
 Bembidion vividum Casey, 1884
 Bembidion vodozi Sainte-Claire Deville, 1906
 Bembidion vseteckai Maran, 1936
 Bembidion vulcanium Darlington, 1934
 Bembidion vulcanix Sproul & Maddison, 2018
 Bembidion vulpecula Casey, 1918

W

 Bembidion waialeale Liebherr, 2008
 Bembidion waiho Larochelle & Larivière, 2015
 Bembidion waimarama Larochelle & Larivière, 2015
 Bembidion walterrossii Toledano, 2008
 Bembidion wanakense Lindroth, 1976
 Bembidion wardii Toledano, 2008
 Bembidion watanabei Morita, 2003
 Bembidion waziristanum Andrewes, 1932
 Bembidion weiratherianum Netolitzky, 1932
 Bembidion whymperi Moret & Toledano, 2002
 Bembidion wickhami Hayward, 1897
 Bembidion wittmeri (Basilewsky, 1979)
 Bembidion wolfgangi Toledano, 2008
 Bembidion wraseanum Toledano, 1998
 Bembidion wrzecionkoi Toledano & Schmidt, 2008
 Bembidion wui Toledano & Terada, 2014
 Bembidion wutaishanense Kirschenhofer, 1984

X Y Z

 Bembidion xanthacrum Chaudoir, 1850
 Bembidion xanthocerum Bates, 1883
 Bembidion xanthochiton Andrewes, 1922
 Bembidion xanthoxanthum Netolitzky, 1939
 Bembidion xestum Andrewes, 1923
 Bembidion yakushimanum Sasakawa, 2007
 Bembidion yamtso Schmidt, 2018
 Bembidion yasudai Morita, 2019
 Bembidion yatsuense Morita, 2009
 Bembidion yehi Toledano & Terada, 2014
 Bembidion yokohamae (Bates, 1883)
 Bembidion yoshidai Morita, 2009
 Bembidion yoshikawai (Morita, 1996)
 Bembidion youngi Moret & Toledano, 2002
 Bembidion yuae Toledano, 2008
 Bembidion yukonum Fall, 1926
 Bembidion yunnanum Andrewes, 1923
 Bembidion zagrosense (Morvan, 1972)
 Bembidion zaitzevi Lutshnik, 1938
 Bembidion zanettii Toledano, 2008
 Bembidion zephyrum Fall, 1910
 Bembidion zierisi Toledano, 2008
 Bembidion zlotini Mikhailov, 1996
 Bembidion zolotarewi Reitter, 1910
 Bembidion zugmayeri Schmidt, 2018

Extinct

 † Bembidion absolutum Giebel, 1856
 † Bembidion alekseevi Schmidt & Michalik, 2015
 † Bembidion bipunctatum Lomnicki, 1894
 † Bembidion boryslavicum Lomnicki, 1894
 † Bembidion bukejsi Schmidt & Michalik, 2015
 † Bembidion christelae Ortuño & Arillo, 2010
 † Bembidion cyaneomicans Piton, 1940
 † Bembidion damnosum Scudder, 1900
 † Bembidion davidae Pierce, 1944
 † Bembidion everestae Pierce, 1944
 † Bembidion exoletum Scudder, 1876
 † Bembidion expletum Scudder, 1900
 † Bembidion festivum Zhang; Sun & Zhang, 1994
 † Bembidion florissantense Wickham, 1913
 † Bembidion fragmentum Scudder, 1890
 † Bembidion glaciatum Scudder, 1890
 † Bembidion haywardi Scudder, 1900
 † Bembidion inferum Heer, 1856
 † Bembidion levigatum Forster, 1891
 † Bembidion obductum Scudder, 1900
 † Bembidion praeteritum Scudder, 1900
 † Bembidion saportanum Oustalet, 1874
 † Bembidion strenum Zhang; Liu & Shangguan, 2010
 † Bembidion subcontaminatum Lomnicki, 1894
 † Bembidion succini Giebel, 1856
 † Bembidion tumulorum Scudder, 1900
 † Bembidion vanum Scudder, 1900
 † Bembidion vestigium Scudder, 1900

References

Bembidion